The Second Boer War (11 October 189931 May 1902), also known as the Boer War, the Anglo–Boer War, or the South African War, was a conflict which was fought between the British Empire and the two Boer Republics (the South African Republic and the Orange Free State) over the Empire's influence in Southern Africa from 1899 to 1902.

Following the discovery of gold deposits in the Boer republics, there was a large influx of "foreigners", mostly British from the Cape Colony.  They were not permitted to have a vote, and were regarded as "unwelcome visitors", invaders, and they protested to the British authorities in the Cape.  Negotiations failed and, in the opening stages of the war, the Boers launched successful attacks against British outposts before being pushed back by imperial reinforcements. Though the British swiftly occupied the Boer republics, numerous Boers refused to accept defeat and engaged in guerrilla warfare. Eventually, British scorched earth policies, and the poor conditions suffered in concentration camps by Boer women and children who had been displaced by these policies, brought the remaining Boer guerrillas to the negotiating table, ending the war.

The conflict broke out in 1899 after the failure of the Bloemfontein Conference when Boer irregulars and militia attacked colonial settlements in nearby British colonies.  Starting in October 1899, the Boers placed Ladysmith, Kimberley, and Mafeking under siege, and won a string of victories at Colenso, Magersfontein and Stormberg. In response to these developments, increased numbers of British Army soldiers were brought to Southern Africa, and mounted largely unsuccessful attacks against the Boers. However, British military fortunes changed when their commanding officer, General Redvers Buller was replaced by Lord Roberts and Lord Kitchener, who relieved the three besieged cities and invaded the two Boer Republics in early 1900 at the head of a 180,000-strong expeditionary force. The Boers, aware they were unable to resist such a large force, chose to refrain from fighting pitched battles, allowing the British to occupy both republics and their capitals, Pretoria and Bloemfontein.

Boer politicians, including President of the South African Republic Paul Kruger either fled the region or went into hiding; the British Empire officially annexed the two republics in 1900. In Britain, the Conservative ministry led by Lord Salisbury attempted to capitalise on British military successes by calling an early general election, which was dubbed by contemporary observers a "khaki election". However, numerous Boer fighters took to the hills and launched a guerrilla campaign against the British occupational forces, becoming known as bittereinders. Led by prominent generals such as Louis Botha, Jan Smuts, Christiaan de Wet, and Koos de la Rey, Boer guerrillas launched a campaign of hit-and-run attacks and ambushes against the British, which would continue for two years.

The Boer guerrilla campaign proved difficult for the British to defeat, due in part to British unfamiliarity with guerrilla tactics and extensive support for the guerrillas among the civilian population in the Boer Republics. In response to continued failures to defeat the Boer guerillas, British high command ordered several scorched earth policies to be implemented as part of a large scale and multi-pronged counterinsurgency campaign; a complex network of nets, blockhouses, strongpoints and barbed wire fences was constructed, virtually partitioning the occupied republics. British troops committed several war crimes and were ordered to destroy farms and slaughter livestock to deny them to Boer guerillas. Over a hundred thousand Boer civilians (mostly women and children) were forcibly relocated into concentration camps, where 26,000 died of various causes, mostly starvation and disease. Black Africans in the same areas were also interned in concentration camps as well to prevent them from supplying the Boers; 20,000 died in the camps as well, largely due to the same causes as in the case of their Boer counterparts.

In addition to these scorched earth policies, British mounted infantry units were deployed to track down and engage individual Boer guerilla units; by this stage of the war, all battles being fought were small-scale skirmishes. Few combatants on either side were killed in action, with most casualties coming via disease. Lord Kitchener began to offer generous terms of surrender to remaining Boer leaders in an effort to bring an end to the conflict. Eager to ensure their fellow Boers were released from the concentration camps, the majority of Boer commanders accepted the British terms in the Treaty of Vereeniging, formally surrendering in May 1902. The former republics were transformed into the British colonies of the Transvaal and Orange River, and in 1910 were merged with the Natal and Cape Colonies to form the Union of South Africa, a self-governing dominion within the British Empire.

British expeditionary efforts were aided significantly by colonial forces from the Cape Colony, the Natal, Rhodesia, as well as large numbers of volunteers from the British Empire worldwide, particularly Australia, Canada, India and New Zealand. Later in the war, Black African recruits contributed increasingly to the British war effort. International public opinion was generally sympathetic to the Boers and hostile to the British. Even within the United Kingdom, there existed significant opposition to the war. As a result, the Boer cause attracted thousands of volunteers from neutral countries all over the world, including the German Empire, United States, Russia and even some parts of the British Empire such as Australia and Ireland. Many consider the Boer War as marking the beginning of the questioning of the British Empire's veneer of impenetrable global dominance; this is due to the war's surprisingly long duration and the unforeseen, discouraging losses suffered by the British fighting the "cobbled-together army" of Boers.

Overview 

The war had three phases. In the first phase, the Boers mounted preemptive strikes into British-held territory in Natal and the Cape Colony, besieging the British garrisons of Ladysmith, Mafeking, and Kimberley. The Boers then won a series of tactical victories at Stormberg, Magersfontein, Colenso and Spion Kop.

In the second phase, after the number of British troops greatly increased under the command of Lord Roberts, the British launched another offensive in 1900 to relieve the sieges, this time achieving success. After Natal and the Cape Colony were secure, the British army was able to invade the Transvaal, and the republic's capital, Pretoria, was ultimately captured in June 1900.

In the third and final phase, beginning in March 1900 and lasting a further two years, the Boers conducted a hard-fought guerrilla war, attacking British troop columns, telegraph sites, railways, and storage depots. To deny supplies to the Boer guerrillas, the British, now under the leadership of Lord Kitchener, adopted a scorched earth policy. They cleared vast areas, destroying Boer farms and moving the civilians into concentration camps.

Some parts of the British press and British government expected the campaign to be over within months, and the protracted war gradually became less popular, especially after revelations about the conditions in the concentration camps (where as many as 26,000 Afrikaner women and children died of disease and malnutrition). The Boer forces finally surrendered on Saturday, 31 May 1902, with 54 of the 60 delegates from the Transvaal and Orange Free State voting to accept the terms of the peace treaty.< This was known as the Treaty of Vereeniging, and under its provisions, the two republics were absorbed into the British Empire, with the promise of self-government in the future. This promise was fulfilled with the creation of the Union of South Africa in 1910.

The war had a lasting effect on the region and on British domestic politics. For Britain, the Second Boer War was the longest, the most expensive (£211 million, £202 billion at 2014 prices), and the bloodiest conflict between 1815 and 1914, lasting three months longer and resulting in more British combat casualties (see sidebar above) than the Crimean War (1853–1856). (Disease took a greater toll in the Crimean War, claiming 17,580 British.)

Name 

The conflict is commonly referred to simply as “the Boer War” because the First Boer War (December 1880 to March 1881) was a much smaller conflict. Boer (meaning "farmer") is the common name for Afrikaans-speaking white South Africans descended from the Dutch East India Company's original settlers at the Cape of Good Hope. Among some South Africans, it is known as the (Second) Anglo–Boer War.

In South Africa, it is officially called the South African War. In fact, according to a 2011 BBC report, "most scholars prefer to call the war of 1899–1902 the South African War, thereby acknowledging that all South Africans, white and black, were affected by the war and that many were participants".

Origins 

The origins of the war were complex and stemmed from more than a century of conflict between the Boers and Britain. Of immediate importance, however, was the question of who would control and benefit most from the very lucrative Witwatersrand gold mines discovered by Jan Bantjes in June 1884.

The first European settlement in South Africa was founded at the Cape of Good Hope in 1652, and thereafter administered as part of the Dutch Cape Colony. The Cape was governed by the Dutch East India Company, until its bankruptcy in the late 18th century, and was thereafter governed directly by the Netherlands. As a result of political turmoil in the Netherlands, the British occupied the Cape three times during the Napoleonic Wars, and the occupation became permanent after British forces defeated the Dutch at the Battle of Blaauwberg in 1806. At the time, the colony was home to about 26,000 colonists settled under Dutch rule. A relative majority represented old Dutch families brought to the Cape during the late 17th and early 18th centuries; however, close to one-fourth of this demographic was of German origin and one-sixth of French Huguenot descent. Cleavages were likelier to occur along socio-economic rather than ethnic lines. Broadly speaking, the colonists included a number of distinct subgroups, including the Boers. The Boers were itinerant farmers who lived on the colony's frontiers, seeking better pastures for their livestock. Many were dissatisfied with aspects of British administration, in particular with Britain's abolition of slavery on 1 December 1834. Boers who needed forced labor to care for their farms properly would have been unable to collect compensation for their slaves. Between 1836 and 1852, many elected to migrate away from British rule in what became known as the Great Trek.

Around 15,000 trekking Boers departed the Cape Colony and followed the eastern coast towards Natal. After Britain annexed Natal in 1843, they journeyed farther northwards into South Africa's vast eastern interior. There, they established two independent Boer republics: the South African Republic (1852; also known as the Transvaal Republic) and the Orange Free State (1854). Britain recognised the two Boer republics in 1852 and 1854, but attempted British annexation of the Transvaal in 1877 led to the First Boer War in 18801881. After Britain suffered defeats, particularly at the Battle of Majuba Hill (1881), the independence of the two republics was restored, subject to certain conditions. However, relations remained uneasy.

In 1866, diamonds were discovered at Kimberley, prompting a diamond rush and a massive influx of foreigners to the borders of the Orange Free State. Then, in June 1884, gold was discovered in the Witwatersrand area of the South African Republic by Jan Gerritze Bantjes. Gold made the Transvaal the richest nation in southern Africa; however, the country had neither the manpower nor the industrial base to develop the resource on its own. As a result, the Transvaal reluctantly acquiesced to the immigration of uitlanders (foreigners), mainly English-speaking men from Britain, who came to the Boer region in search of fortune and employment.

Britain's expansionist ideas (notably propagated by Cecil Rhodes) as well as disputes over uitlander political and economic rights led to the failed Jameson Raid of 1895. Dr. Leander Starr Jameson, who led the raid, intended to encourage an uprising of the uitlanders in Johannesburg. However, the uitlanders did not take up arms in support, and Transvaal government forces surrounded the column and captured Jameson's men before they could reach Johannesburg.

As tensions escalated, political manoeuvrings and negotiations attempted to reach compromise on the issues of uitlanders' rights within the South African Republic, control of the gold mining industry, and Britain's desire to incorporate the Transvaal and the Orange Free State into a federation under British control. Given the British origins of the majority of uitlanders and the ongoing influx of new uitlanders into Johannesburg, the Boers recognised that granting full voting rights to the uitlanders would eventually result in the loss of ethnic Boer control in the South African Republic.

The June 1899 negotiations in Bloemfontein failed, and in September 1899 British Colonial Secretary Joseph Chamberlain demanded full voting rights and representation for the uitlanders residing in the Transvaal. Paul Kruger, the President of the South African Republic, issued an ultimatum on 9 October 1899, giving the British government 48 hours to withdraw all their troops from the borders of both the Transvaal and the Orange Free State, failing which the Transvaal, allied to the Orange Free State, would declare war on the British government. (In fact, Kruger had ordered Commandos to the Natal border in early September, and Britain had only troops in garrison towns far from the border.) The British government rejected the South African Republic's ultimatum, and the South African Republic and Orange Free State declared war on Britain.

Historical background 

The southern part of the African continent was dominated in the 19th century by a set of struggles to create within it a single unified state. In 1868, Britain annexed Basutoland in the Drakensberg Mountains, following an appeal from Moshoeshoe I, the king of the Sotho people, who sought British protection against the Boers. While the Berlin Conference of 1884–1885 sought to draw boundaries between the European powers' African possessions, it also set the stage for further scrambles. Britain attempted to annex first the South African Republic in 1880, and then, in 1899, both the South African Republic and the Orange Free State.

In the 1880s, Bechuanaland (modern Botswana) became the object of a dispute between the Germans to the west, the Boers to the east, and Britain's Cape Colony to the south. Although Bechuanaland had no economic value, the "Missionaries Road" passed through it towards territory farther north. After the Germans annexed Damaraland and Namaqualand (modern Namibia) in 1884, Britain annexed Bechuanaland in 1885.

In the First Boer War of 1880–1881 the Boers of the Transvaal Republic proved skilful fighters in resisting Britain's attempt at annexation, causing a series of British defeats. The British government of William Ewart Gladstone was unwilling to become mired in a distant war, requiring substantial troop reinforcement and expense, for what was perceived at the time to be a minimal return. An armistice ended the war, and subsequently a peace treaty was signed with the Transvaal President Paul Kruger.

The ridge was known locally as the "Witwatersrand" (white water ridge, a watershed). A gold rush to the Transvaal brought thousands of British and other prospectors and settlers from around the globe and over the border from the Cape Colony, which had been under British control since 1806.

The city of Johannesburg sprang up nearly overnight as a shanty town. Uitlanders (foreigners, white outsiders) poured in and settled around the mines. The influx was so rapid that uitlanders quickly outnumbered the Boers in Johannesburg and along the Rand, although they remained a minority in the Transvaal. The Boers, nervous and resentful of the uitlanders' growing presence, sought to contain their influence through requiring lengthy residential qualifying periods before voting rights could be obtained; by imposing taxes on the gold industry; and by introducing controls through licensing, tariffs and administrative requirements. Among the issues giving rise to tension between the Transvaal government on the one hand and the uitlanders and British interests on the other, were
 Established uitlanders, including the mining magnates, wanted political, social, and economic control over their lives. These rights included a stable constitution, a fair franchise law, an independent judiciary and a better educational system. The Boers, for their part, recognised that the more concessions they made to the uitlanders the greater the likelihood—with approximately 30,000 white male Boer voters and potentially 60,000 white male uitlanders—that their independent control of the Transvaal would be lost and the territory absorbed into the British Empire.
 The uitlanders resented the taxes levied by the Transvaal government, particularly when this money was not spent on Johannesburg or uitlander interests, but diverted to projects elsewhere in the Transvaal. For example, as the gold-bearing ore sloped away from the outcrop underground to the south, more and more blasting was necessary to extract it, and mines consumed vast quantities of explosives. A box of dynamite costing five pounds included five shillings tax. Not only was this tax perceived as exorbitant, but British interests were offended when President Paul Kruger gave monopoly rights for the manufacture of the explosive to a non-British branch of the Nobel company, which infuriated Britain. The so-called "dynamite monopoly" became a casus belli.

British imperial interests were alarmed when in 1894–1895 Kruger proposed building a railway through Portuguese East Africa to Delagoa Bay, bypassing British-controlled ports in Natal and Cape Town and avoiding British tariffs. At the time, the Prime Minister of the Cape Colony was Cecil Rhodes, a man driven by a vision of a British-controlled Africa extending from the Cape to Cairo. Certain self-appointed uitlanders representatives and British mine owners became increasingly frustrated and angered by their dealings with the Transvaal government. A Reform Committee (Transvaal) was formed to represent the uitlanders.

 Jameson Raid 

In 1895, a plan to take Johannesburg and end the control of the Transvaal government was hatched with the connivance of the Cape Prime Minister Cecil Rhodes and Johannesburg gold magnate Alfred Beit. A column of 600 armed men was led over the border from Bechuanaland towards Johannesburg by Dr Leander Starr Jameson, the Administrator in Rhodesia of the British South Africa Company, of which Cecil Rhodes was the Chairman. The column, mainly made up of Rhodesian and Bechuanaland British South Africa Policemen, was equipped with Maxim machine guns and some artillery pieces.

The plan was to make a three-day dash to Johannesburg and trigger an uprising by the primarily British expatriate uitlanders, organised by the Johannesburg Reform Committee, before the Boer commandos could mobilise. However, the Transvaal authorities had advance warning of the Jameson Raid and tracked it from the moment it crossed the border. Four days later, the weary and dispirited column was surrounded near Krugersdorp, within sight of Johannesburg. After a brief skirmish in which the column lost 65 killed and wounded—while the Boers lost but one man—Jameson's men surrendered and were arrested by the Boers.

The botched raid had repercussions throughout southern Africa and in Europe. In Rhodesia, the departure of so many policemen enabled the Matabele and Mashona peoples' rising against the British South Africa Company. The rebellion, known as the Second Matabele War, was suppressed only at a great cost.

A few days after the raid, the German Kaiser sent a telegram—known to history as “the Kruger telegram”—congratulating President Kruger and the government of the South African Republic on their success. When the text of this telegram was disclosed in the British press, it generated a storm of anti-German feeling. In the baggage of the raiding column, to the great embarrassment of Britain, the Boers found telegrams from Cecil Rhodes and the other plotters in Johannesburg. British Colonial Secretary Joseph Chamberlain had approved Rhodes' plans to send armed assistance in the case of a Johannesburg uprising, but he quickly moved to condemn the raid. Rhodes was severely censured at the Cape inquiry and the London parliamentary inquiry and was forced to resign as Prime Minister of the Cape and as Chairman of the British South Africa Company, for having sponsored the failed coup d'état.

The Boer government handed their prisoners over to the British for trial. Jameson was tried in England, where the British press and London society, inflamed by anti-Boer and anti-German feeling and in a frenzy of jingoism, lionised him and treated him as a hero. Although sentenced to 15 months imprisonment (which he served in Holloway), Jameson was later rewarded by being named Prime Minister of the Cape Colony (1904–1908) and was ultimately anointed as one of the founders of the Union of South Africa. For conspiring with Jameson, the uitlander members of the Reform Committee (Transvaal) were tried in the Transvaal courts and found guilty of high treason. The four leaders were sentenced to death by hanging, but the next day this sentence was commuted to 15 years' imprisonment. In June 1896, the other members of the committee were released on payment of £2,000 each in fines, all of which were paid by Cecil Rhodes. One Reform Committee member, Frederick Gray, committed suicide while in Pretoria gaol, on 16 May. His death was a factor in softening the Transvaal government's attitude to the surviving prisoners.

Jan C. Smuts wrote, in 1906,

{{blockquote|The Jameson Raid was the real declaration of war ... And that is so in spite of the four years of truce that followed ... [the] aggressors consolidated their alliance ... the defenders on the other hand silently and grimly prepared for the inevitable".

 Escalation 

The Jameson Raid alienated many Cape Afrikaners from Britain and united the Transvaal Boers behind President Kruger and his government. It also had the effect of drawing the Transvaal and the Orange Free State (led by President Martinus Theunis Steyn) together in opposition to perceived British imperialism. In 1897, the two republics concluded a military pact.

 Arming the Boers 

In earlier conflicts, the Boers' most common weapon was the British Westley Richards falling-block breech-loader. In his book The First Boer War, Joseph Lehmann offers this comment: "Employing chiefly the very fine breech-loading Westley Richards – calibre 45; paper cartridge; percussion-cap replaced on the nipple manually—they made it exceedingly dangerous for the British to expose themselves on the skyline".

President Paul Kruger re-equipped the Transvaal army, importing 37,000 of the latest 7x57 mm Mauser Model 1895 rifles supplied by Germany, and some 40 to 50 million rounds of ammunition. Some commandos used the Martini-Henry Mark III, because thousands of these had been purchased. Unfortunately, the large puff of white smoke after firing gave away the shooter's position. Roughly 7,000 Guedes 1885 rifles had also been purchased a few years earlier, and these were also used during the hostilities.

As the war went on, some commandos relied on captured British rifles, such as the Lee-Metford and the Enfield. Indeed, when the ammunition for the Mausers ran out, the Boers relied primarily on the captured Lee-Metfords.

Regardless of the rifle, few of the Boers used bayonets.

The Boers also purchased the best modern European German Krupp artillery. By October 1899, the Transvaal State Artillery had 73 heavy guns, including four 155 mm Creusot fortress guns and 25 of the 37 mm Maxim Nordenfeldt guns.
The Boers' Maxim, larger than the British Maxims, was a large calibre, belt-fed, water-cooled "auto cannon" that fired explosive rounds (smokeless ammunition) at 450 rounds per minute. It became known as the "Pom Pom".

Aside from weaponry, the tactics used by the Boers were significant. As one modern source states, "Boer soldiers ... were adept at guerrilla warfare—something the British had difficulty countering".

The Transvaal army was transformed: Approximately 25,000 men equipped with modern rifles and artillery could mobilise within two weeks. However, President Kruger's victory in the Jameson Raid incident did nothing to resolve the fundamental problem of finding a formula to conciliate the uitlanders, without surrendering the independence of the Transvaal.

 British case for war 

The failure to gain improved rights for uitlanders (notably the goldfields dynamite tax) became a pretext for war and a justification for a big military build-up in Cape Colony. The case for war was developed and espoused as far away as the Australian colonies. Cape Colony Governor Sir Alfred Milner; Cape Prime Minister Cecil Rhodes; Colonial Secretary Joseph Chamberlain; and mining syndicate owners such as Alfred Beit, Barney Barnato, and Lionel Phillips, favoured annexation of the Boer republics. Confident that the Boers would be quickly defeated, they planned and organised a short war, citing the uitlanders' grievances as the motivation for the conflict. In contrast, the influence of the war party within the British government was limited. UK Prime Minister, Lord Salisbury, despised jingoism and jingoists. He was also uncertain of the abilities of the British Army. Despite both his moral and practical reservations, Salisbury led the United Kingdom to war in order to preserve the British Empire's prestige, and feeling a sense of obligation to British South Africans. Salisbury also detested the Boers treatment of native Africans, referring to the London Convention of 1884, (following Britain's defeat in the first war), as an agreement "really in the interest of slavery". Salisbury was not alone in this concern. Roger Casement, already well on the way to becoming an Irish Nationalist, was nevertheless happy to gather intelligence for the British against the Boers because of their cruelty to Africans.

The British government went against the advice of its generals (including Wolseley) and declined to send substantial reinforcements to South Africa before war broke out. Secretary of State for War Lansdowne did not believe the Boers were preparing for war and that if Britain were to send large numbers of troops to the region it would strike too aggressive a posture and possibly derail a negotiated settlement—or even encourage a Boer attack.

 Negotiations fail 

President Steyn of the Orange Free State invited Milner and Kruger to attend a conference in Bloemfontein. The conference started on 30 May 1899, but negotiations quickly broke down, as Kruger had no intention of granting meaningful concessions, and Milner had no intention of accepting his normal delaying tactics.

 Kruger's ultimatum and war 

On the 9th of October 1899, after convincing the Orange Free State to join him and mobilising their forces, Kruger issued an ultimatum giving Britain 48 hours to withdraw all their troops from the border of Transvaal (despite the fact that the only regular British army troops anywhere near the border of either republic were 4 companies of the Loyal North Lancs, who had been deployed to defend Kimberley). Otherwise, the Transvaal, allied with the Orange Free State, would declare war.

News of the ultimatum reached London on the day it expired. Outrage and laughter were the main responses. The editor of the Times purportedly laughed out loud when he read it, saying 'an official document is seldom amusing and useful yet this was both'. The Times denounced the ultimatum as an 'extravagant farce' and The Globe denounced this 'trumpery little state'. Most editorials were similar to the Daily Telegraph's, which declared: 'of course there can only be one answer to this grotesque challenge. Kruger has asked for war and war he must have!'

Such views were far from those of the British government and from those in the army. To most sensible observers, army reform had been a matter of pressing concern since the 1870s, constantly put off because the British public did not want the expense of a larger, more professional army and because a large home army was not politically welcome. Lord Salisbury, the Prime Minister, had to tell a surprised Queen Victoria that 'We have no army capable of meeting even a second-class Continental Power'.

 First phase: The Boer offensive (October–December 1899) 

 British Army deployed 

When war with the Boer republics was imminent in September 1899, a Field Force, referred to as the Army Corps (sometimes 1st Army Corps) was mobilised and sent to Cape Town. It was "about the equivalent of the I Army Corps of the existing mobilization scheme" and was placed under the command of Gen Sir Redvers Buller, GOC in C of Aldershot Command. In South Africa the corps never operated as such and the 1st, 2nd, 3rd divisions were widely dispersed.

 Boer organization and skills 

War was declared on 11 October 1899 with a Boer offensive into the British-held Natal and Cape Colony areas. The Boers had about 33,000 soldiers, and decisively outnumbered the British, who could move only 13,000 troops to the front line. The Boers had no problems with mobilisation, since the fiercely independent Boers had no regular army units, apart from the Staatsartillerie (Dutch for 'State Artillery') of both republics. As with the First Boer War, since most of the Boers were members of civilian militias, none had adopted uniforms or insignia. Only the members of the Staatsartillerie wore light green uniforms.

When danger loomed, all the burgers (citizens) in a district would form a military unit called a commando and would elect officers. A full-time official called a Veldkornet maintained muster rolls, but had no disciplinary powers. Each man brought his own weapon, usually a hunting rifle, and his own horse. Those who could not afford a gun were given one by the authorities. The Presidents of the Transvaal and Orange Free State simply signed decrees to concentrate within a week, and the Commandos could muster between 30,000 and 40,000 men. The average Boer nevertheless was not thirsty for war. Many did not look forward to fighting against fellow Christians and, by and large, fellow Christian Protestants. Many may have had an overly optimistic sense of what the war would involve, imagining that victory could be achieved as fast and easily as it had been in the First Anglo-Boer War. Many, including many generals, also had a sense that their cause was holy and just, and blessed by God.

It rapidly became clear that the Boer forces presented the British forces with a severe tactical challenge. What the Boers presented was a mobile and innovative approach to warfare, drawing on their experiences from the First Boer War. The average Boers who made up their Commandos were farmers who had spent almost all their working life in the saddle, both as farmers and hunters. They depended on the pot, horse and rifle; they were also skilled stalkers and marksmen. As hunters, they had learned to fire from cover; from a prone position and to make the first shot count, knowing that if they missed, the game would either be long gone or could charge and potentially kill them.

They made expert mounted infantry, using every scrap of cover, from which they could pour in a destructive fire using modern, smokeless, Mauser rifles. In preparation for hostilities, the Boers had acquired around one hundred of the latest Krupp field guns, all horse-drawn and dispersed among the various Kommando groups and several Le Creusot "Long Tom" siege guns. The Boers' skill in adapting themselves to become first-rate artillerymen shows that they were a versatile adversary. The Transvaal also had an intelligence service that stretched across South Africa and of whose extent and efficiency the British were as yet unaware.

 Boers besiege Ladysmith, Mafeking and Kimberley 

The Boers struck first on 12 October at the Battle of Kraaipan, an attack that heralded the invasion of the Cape Colony and Colony of Natal between October 1899 and January 1900. With speed and surprise, the Boers drove quickly towards the British garrison at Ladysmith and the smaller ones at Mafeking and Kimberley. The quick Boer mobilisation resulted in early military successes against scattered British forces. Sir George Stuart White, commanding the British division at Ladysmith, unwisely allowed Major-General Penn Symons to throw a brigade forward to the coal-mining town of Dundee (also reported as Glencoe), which was surrounded by hills. This became the site of the first engagement of the war, the Battle of Talana Hill. Boer guns began shelling the British camp from the summit of Talana Hill at dawn on 20 October. Penn Symons immediately counter-attacked: His infantry drove the Boers from the hill, for the loss of 446 British casualties, including Penn Symons.

Another Boer force occupied Elandslaagte, which lay between Ladysmith and Dundee. The British under Major General John French and Colonel Ian Hamilton attacked to clear the line of communications to Dundee. The resulting Battle of Elandslaagte was a clear-cut British tactical victory, but Sir George White feared that more Boers were about to attack his main position and so ordered a chaotic retreat from Elandslaagte, throwing away any advantage gained. The detachment from Dundee was compelled to make an exhausting cross-country retreat to rejoin White's main force. As Boers surrounded Ladysmith and opened fire on the town with siege guns, White ordered a major sortie against their positions. The result was a disaster, with 140 men killed and over 1,000 captured. The Siege of Ladysmith began: It was to last several months.

Meanwhile, to the north-west at Mafeking, on the border with Transvaal, Colonel Robert Baden-Powell had raised two regiments of local forces amounting to about 1,200 men in order to attack and create diversions if things went amiss further south. As a railway junction, Mafeking provided good supply facilities and was the obvious place for Baden-Powell to fortify in readiness for such attacks. However, instead of being the aggressor, Baden-Powell was forced to defend Mafeking when 6,000 Boer, commanded by Piet Cronjé, attempted a determined assault on the town. This quickly subsided into a desultory affair, with the Boers prepared to starve the stronghold into submission. So, on 13 October, the 217-day Siege of Mafeking began.

Although not militarily significant, it nonetheless represented an enclave of British imperialism on the borders of the Orange Free State and was hence an important Boer objective. In early November, about 7,500 Boer began their siege, again content to starve the town into submission. Despite Boer shelling, the 40,000 inhabitants, of which only 5,000 were armed, were under little threat, because the town was well-stocked with provisions. The garrison was commanded by Lieutenant Colonel Robert Kekewich, although Cecil Rhodes was also a prominent figure in the town's defences.

Siege life took its toll on both the defending soldiers and the civilians in the cities of Mafeking, Ladysmith, and Kimberley as food began to grow scarce after a few weeks. In Mafeking, Sol Plaatje wrote, "I saw horseflesh for the first time being treated as a human foodstuff." The cities under siege also dealt with constant artillery bombardment, making the streets a dangerous place. Near the end of the siege of Kimberley, it was expected that the Boers would intensify their bombardment, so Rhodes displayed a notice encouraging people to go down into shafts of the Kimberley Mine for protection. The townspeople panicked, and people surged into the mine-shafts constantly for a 12-hour period. Although the bombardment never came, this did nothing to diminish the anxious civilians' distress. The most well-heeled of the townspeople, including Cecil Rhodes, sheltered in the Sanatorium, site of the present-day McGregor Museum; the poorer residents, notably the black population, did not have any shelter from shelling.

In retrospect, the Boers' decision to commit themselves to sieges (Sitzkrieg) was a mistake and one of the best illustrations of their lack of strategic vision. Historically, it had little in its favour. Of the seven sieges in the First Boer War, the Boers had prevailed in none. More importantly, it handed the initiative back to the British and allowed them time to recover, which they did. Generally speaking, throughout the campaign, the Boers were too defensive and passive, wasting the opportunities they had for victory. Yet that passiveness also testified to the fact that they had no desire to conquer British territory, but only to preserve their ability to rule in their own territory.

 First British relief attempts 

On the 31st October 1899, General Sir Redvers Henry Buller, a much respected commander, arrived in South Africa with the Army Corps, made up of the 1st, 2nd and 3rd divisions. Buller originally intended an offensive straight up the railway line leading from Cape Town through Bloemfontein to Pretoria. Finding on arrival that the British troops already in South Africa were under siege, he split his army corps into detachments to relieve the besieged garrisons. One division, led by Lieutenant General Lord Methuen, was to follow the Western Railway to the north and relieve Kimberley and Mafeking. A smaller force of about 3,000, led by Major General William Gatacre, was to push north towards the railway junction at Stormberg and secure the Cape Midlands District from Boer raids and local rebellions by Boer inhabitants. Buller led the major part of the army corps to relieve Ladysmith to the east.

The initial results of this offensive were mixed, with Methuen winning several bloody skirmishes in the Battle of Belmont on 23 November, the Battle of Graspan on 25 November, and at a larger engagement, the Battle of Modder River, on 28 November resulting in British losses of 71 dead and over 400 wounded. British commanders had been trained on the lessons of the Crimean War and were adept at battalion and regimental set pieces, with columns manoeuvring in jungles, deserts and mountainous regions. What British generals failed to comprehend was the impact of destructive fire from trench positions and the mobility of cavalry raids. The British troops went to war with what would prove to be antiquated tactics—and in some cases antiquated weapons—against the mobile Boer forces with the destructive fire of their modern Mausers, the latest Krupp field guns and their novel tactics.

The middle of December was disastrous for the British Army. In a period known as Black Week (10–15 December 1899), the British suffered defeats on each of the three fronts. Gatacre's attack was marked by administrative and tactical blunders and the Battle of Stormberg ended in a British defeat, with 135 killed and wounded and two guns and over 600 troops captured.

At the Battle of Magersfontein on 11 December, Methuen's 14,000 British troops attempted to capture a Boer position in a dawn attack to relieve Kimberley. This too turned into a disaster when the Highland Brigade became pinned down by accurate Boer fire. After suffering from intense heat and thirst for nine hours, they eventually broke in ill-disciplined retreat. The Boer commanders, Koos de la Rey and Piet Cronjé, had ordered trenches to be dug in an unconventional place to fool the British and to give their riflemen a greater firing range. The plan worked, and this tactic helped to write the doctrine of the supremacy of the defensive position, using modern small arms and trench fortifications. The British lost 120 killed and 690 wounded and were prevented from relieving Kimberley and Mafeking. A British soldier said of the defeat:

{{blockquote|Such was the day for our regimentDread the revenge we will take.Dearly we paid for the blunder –A drawing-room General's mistake.Why weren't we told of the trenches?Why weren't we told of the wire? Why were we marched up in column,May Tommy Atkins enquire ...|Private Smith

The nadir of Black Week was the Battle of Colenso on 15 December, where 21,000 British troops, commanded by Buller, attempted to cross the Tugela River to relieve Ladysmith, where 8,000 Transvaal Boers under the command of Louis Botha were waiting for them. Through a combination of artillery and accurate rifle fire and better use of the ground, the Boers repelled all British attempts to cross the river. After his first attacks failed, Buller broke off the battle and ordered a retreat, abandoning many wounded men, several isolated units and ten field guns to be captured by Botha's men. Buller's forces lost 145 men killed and 1,200 missing or wounded and the Boers suffered only 40 casualties, including 8 killed.

 Second phase: The British offensive of January to September 1900 

The British government took these defeats badly and with the sieges still continuing was compelled to send two more divisions plus large numbers of colonial volunteers. By January 1900 this would become the largest force Britain had ever sent overseas, amounting to some 180,000 men with further reinforcements being sought.

While watching for these reinforcements, Buller made another bid to relieve Ladysmith by crossing the Tugela west of Colenso. Buller's subordinate, Major General Charles Warren, successfully crossed the river, but was then faced with a fresh defensive position centred on a prominent hill known as Spion Kop. In the resulting Battle of Spion Kop, British troops captured the summit by surprise during the early hours of 24 January 1900, but as the early morning fog lifted they realised too late that they were overlooked by Boer gun emplacements on the surrounding hills. The rest of the day resulted in a disaster caused by poor communication between Buller and his commanders. Between them they issued contradictory orders, on the one hand ordering men off the hill, while other officers ordered fresh reinforcements to defend it. The result was 350 men killed and nearly 1,000 wounded and a retreat across the Tugela River into British territory. There were nearly 300 Boer casualties.

Buller attacked Louis Botha again on 5 February at Vaal Krantz and was again defeated. Buller withdrew early when it appeared that the British would be isolated in an exposed bridgehead across the Tugela, for which he was nicknamed "Sir Reverse" by some of his officers.

 Buller replaced 

By taking command in person in Natal, Buller had allowed the overall direction of the war to drift. Because of concerns about his performance and negative reports from the field, he was replaced as Commander in Chief by Field Marshal Lord Roberts. Roberts quickly assembled an entirely new team for headquarters staff and he chose military men from far and wide: Lord Kitchener (Chief of Staff) from the Sudan; Frederick Russell Burnham (Chief of Scouts), the American scout, from the Klondike; George Henderson from the Staff College; Neville Bowles Chamberlain from Afghanistan; and William Nicholson (Military Secretary) from Calcutta. Like Buller, Roberts first intended to attack directly along the Cape Town–Pretoria railway but, again like Buller, was forced to relieve the beleaguered garrisons. Leaving Buller in command in Natal, Roberts massed his main force near the Orange River and along the Western Railway behind Methuen's force at the Modder River, and prepared to make a wide outflanking move to relieve Kimberley.

Except in Natal, the war had stagnated. Other than a single attempt to storm Ladysmith, the Boers made no attempt to capture the besieged towns. In the Cape Midlands, the Boers did not exploit the British defeat at Stormberg, and were prevented from capturing the railway junction at Colesberg. In the dry summer, the grazing on the veld became parched, weakening the Boers' horses and draught oxen, and many Boer families joined their menfolk in the siege lines and laagers (encampments), fatally encumbering Cronjé's army.

 Roberts relieves the sieges 

Roberts launched his main attack on 10 February 1900 and although hampered by a long supply route, managed to outflank the Boers defending Magersfontein. On 14 February, a cavalry division under Major General John French launched a major attack to relieve Kimberley. Although encountering severe fire, a massed cavalry charge split the Boer defences on 15 February, opening the way for French to enter Kimberley that evening, ending its 124 days' siege.

Meanwhile, Roberts pursued Piet Cronjé's 7,000-strong force, which had abandoned Magersfontein to head for Bloemfontein. General French's cavalry was ordered to assist in the pursuit by embarking on an epic  drive towards Paardeberg where Cronjé was attempting to cross the Modder River. At the Battle of Paardeberg from 18 to 27 February, Roberts then surrounded General Piet Cronjé's retreating Boer army. On 17 February, a pincer movement involving both French's cavalry and the main British force attempted to take the entrenched position, but the frontal attacks were uncoordinated and so were repulsed by the Boers. Finally, Roberts resorted to bombarding Cronjé into submission. It took ten days, and when the British troops used the polluted Modder River as water supply, typhoid killed many troops. General Cronjé was forced to surrender at Surrender Hill with 4,000 men.

In Natal, the Battle of the Tugela Heights, which started on 14 February was Buller's fourth attempt to relieve Ladysmith. The losses Buller's troops had sustained convinced Buller to adopt Boer tactics "in the firing line—to advance in small rushes, covered by rifle fire from behind; to use the tactical support of artillery; and above all, to use the ground, making rock and earth work for them as it did for the enemy." Despite reinforcements his progress was painfully slow against stiff opposition. However, on 26 February, after much deliberation, Buller used all his forces in one all-out attack for the first time and at last succeeded in forcing a crossing of the Tugela to defeat Botha's outnumbered forces north of Colenso. After a siege lasting 118 days, the Relief of Ladysmith was effected, the day after Cronjé surrendered, but at a total cost of 7,000 British casualties. Buller's troops marched into Ladysmith on 28 February.

After a succession of defeats, the Boers realised that against such overwhelming numbers of troops, they had little chance of defeating the British and so became demoralised. Roberts then advanced into the Orange Free State from the west, putting the Boers to flight at the Battle of Poplar Grove and capturing Bloemfontein, the capital, unopposed on 13 March with the Boer defenders escaping and scattering. Meanwhile, he detached a small force to relieve Baden-Powell. The Relief of Mafeking on 18 May 1900 provoked riotous celebrations in Britain, the origin of the Edwardian slang word "mafficking". On 28 May, the Orange Free State was annexed and renamed the Orange River Colony.

 Capture of Pretoria 

After being forced to delay for several weeks at Bloemfontein by a shortage of supplies, an outbreak of typhoid at Paardeberg, and poor medical care, Roberts finally resumed his advance. He was forced to halt again at Kroonstad for 10 days, due once again to the collapse of his medical and supply systems, but finally captured Johannesburg on 31 May and the capital of the Transvaal, Pretoria, on 5 June. The first into Pretoria was Lt. William Watson of the New South Wales Mounted Rifles, who persuaded the Boers to surrender the capital. Before the war, the Boers had constructed several forts south of Pretoria, but the artillery had been removed from the forts for use in the field, and in the event they abandoned Pretoria without a fight. Having won the principal cities, Roberts declared the war over on 3 September 1900; and the South African Republic was formally annexed.

British observers believed the war to be all but over after the capture of the two capital cities. However, the Boers had earlier met at the temporary new capital of the Orange Free State, Kroonstad, and planned a guerrilla campaign to hit the British supply and communication lines.

After the fall of Pretoria, one of the last formal battles was at Diamond Hill on 11–12 June, where Roberts attempted to drive the remnants of the Boer field army under Botha beyond striking distance of Pretoria. Although Roberts drove the Boers from the hill, Botha did not regard it as a defeat, for he inflicted 162 casualties on the British while suffering only around 50 casualties.

 Boers retreat 

The set-piece period of the war now largely gave way to a mobile guerrilla war, but one final operation remained. President Kruger and what remained of the Transvaal government had retreated to eastern Transvaal. Roberts, joined by troops from Natal under Buller, advanced against them, and broke their last defensive position at Bergendal on 26 August. As Roberts and Buller followed up along the railway line to Komatipoort, Kruger sought asylum in Portuguese East Africa (modern Mozambique). Some dispirited Boers did likewise, and the British gathered up much war material. However, the core of the Boer fighters under Botha easily broke back through the Drakensberg Mountains into the Transvaal highveld after riding north through the bushveld.

As Roberts's army occupied Pretoria, the Boer fighters in the Orange Free State retreated into the Brandwater Basin, a fertile area in the north-east of the Republic. This offered only temporary sanctuary, as the mountain passes leading to it could be occupied by the British, trapping the Boers. A force under General Archibald Hunter set out from Bloemfontein to achieve this in July 1900. The hard core of the Free State Boers under De Wet, accompanied by President Steyn, left the basin early. Those remaining fell into confusion and most failed to break out before Hunter trapped them. 4,500 Boers surrendered and much equipment was captured but as with Roberts's drive against Kruger at the same time, these losses were of relatively little consequence, as the hard core of the Boer armies and their most determined and active leaders remained at large.

From the Basin, Christiaan de Wet headed west. Although hounded by British columns, he succeeded in crossing the Vaal into western Transvaal, to allow Steyn to travel to meet their leaders. There was much sympathy for the Boers on mainland Europe. In October, President Kruger and members of the Transvaal government left Portuguese East Africa on the Dutch warship De Gelderland, sent by the Queen Wilhelmina of the Netherlands. Paul Kruger's wife, however, was too ill to travel and remained in South Africa where she died on 20 July 1901 without seeing her husband again. President Kruger first went to Marseille and then on to the Netherlands, where he stayed for a while before moving finally to Clarens, Switzerland, where he died in exile on 14 July 1904.

 Prisoners of war sent overseas 

The first sizeable batch of Boer prisoners of war taken by the British consisted of those captured at the Battle of Elandslaagte on 21 October 1899. At first, many were put on ships, but as numbers grew, the British decided they did not want them kept locally. The capture of 400 POWs in February 1900 was a key event, which made the British realise they could not accommodate all POWs in South Africa. The British feared they could be freed by sympathetic locals. Moreover, they already had trouble supplying their own troops in South Africa, and did not want the added burden of sending supplies for the POWs. Britain therefore chose to send many POWs overseas.

The first overseas (off African mainland) camps were opened in Saint Helena, which ultimately received about 5,000 POWs. About 5,000 POWs were sent to Ceylon. Other POWs were sent to Bermuda and India.

In all, nearly 26,000 POWs were sent overseas.

 Oath of neutrality 

On 15 March 1900, Lord Roberts proclaimed an amnesty for all burghers, except leaders, who took an oath of neutrality and returned quietly to their homes. It is estimated that between 12,000 and 14,000 burghers took this oath between March and June 1900.

 Third phase: Guerrilla war (September 1900 – May 1902) 

By September 1900, the British were nominally in control of both Republics, with the exception of the northern part of Transvaal. However, they soon discovered that they only controlled the territory their columns physically occupied. Despite the loss of their two capital cities and half of their army, the Boer commanders adopted guerrilla warfare tactics, primarily conducting raids against railways, resource and supply targets, all aimed at disrupting the operational capacity of the British Army. They avoided pitched battles and casualties were light.

Each Boer commando unit was sent to the district from which its members had been recruited, which meant that they could rely on local support and personal knowledge of the terrain and the towns within the district thereby enabling them to live off the land. Their orders were simply to act against the British whenever possible. Their tactics were to strike fast and hard causing as much damage to the enemy as possible, and then to withdraw and vanish before enemy reinforcements could arrive. The vast distances of the Republics allowed the Boer commandos considerable freedom to move about and made it nearly impossible for the 250,000 British troops to control the territory effectively using columns alone. As soon as a British column left a town or district, British control of that area faded away.

The Boer commandos were especially effective during the initial guerrilla phase of the war because Roberts had assumed that the war would end with the capture of the Boer capitals and the dispersal of the main Boer armies. Many British troops were therefore redeployed out of the area, and had been replaced by lower-quality contingents of Imperial Yeomanry and locally raised irregular corps.

From late May 1900, the first successes of the Boer guerrilla strategy were at Lindley (where 500 Yeomanry surrendered), and at Heilbron (where a large convoy and its escort were captured) and other skirmishes resulting in 1,500 British casualties in less than ten days. In December 1900, De la Rey and Christiaan Beyers attacked and mauled a British brigade at Nooitgedacht. As a result of these and other Boer successes, the British, led by Lord Kitchener, mounted three extensive searches for Christiaan de Wet, but without success. However, the very nature of the Boer guerrilla war and the Boer raids on British camps were sporadic, poorly planned, and had little overall long-term objective, with the exception to simply harass the British. This led to a disorganised pattern of scattered engagements between the British and the Boers throughout the region.

Use of Blockhouses
The British were forced to quickly revise their tactics. They concentrated on restricting the freedom of movement of the Boer commandos and depriving them of local support. The railway lines had provided vital lines of communication and supply, and as the British had advanced across South Africa, they had used armoured trains and had established fortified blockhouses at key points. They now built additional blockhouses (each housing 6–8 soldiers) and fortified these to protect supply routes against Boer raiders. Eventually some 8,000 such blockhouses were built across the two South African republics, radiating from the larger towns along principal routes. Each blockhouse cost between £800 to £1,000 and took about three months to build. They proved very effective; not one bridge at which a blockhouse was sited and manned was blown.

The blockhouse system required an enormous number of troops to garrison. Well over 50,000 British troops, or 50 battalions, were involved in blockhouse duty, greater than the approximately 30,000 Boers in the field during the guerrilla phase. In addition, up to 16,000 Africans were used both as armed guards and to patrol the line at night. The Army linked the blockhouses with barbed wire fences to parcel up the wide veld into smaller areas. "New Model" drives were mounted under which a continuous line of troops could sweep an area of veld bounded by blockhouse lines, unlike the earlier inefficient scouring of the countryside by scattered columns.

 Scorched earth campaign against civilians 

The British also implemented a "scorched earth" policy under which they targeted everything within the controlled areas that could give sustenance to the Boer guerrillas with a view to making it harder for the Boers to survive. As British troops swept the countryside, they systematically destroyed crops, burned homesteads and farms and interned Boer and African men, women, children and workers in concentration camps. Finally, the British also established their own mounted raiding columns in support of the sweeper columns. These were used to rapidly follow and relentlessly harass the Boers with a view to delaying them and cutting off escape, while the sweeper units caught up. Many of the 90 or so mobile columns formed by the British to participate in such drives were a mixture of British and colonial troops, but they also had a large minority of armed Africans. The total number of armed Africans serving with these columns has been estimated at 20,000.

The British Army also made use of Boer auxiliaries who had been persuaded to change sides and enlist as "National Scouts". Serving under the command of General Andries Cronjé, the National Scouts were despised as joiners but came to number a fifth of the fighting Afrikaners by the end of the War.

The British utilised armoured trains throughout the war to deliver rapid reaction forces much more quickly to incidents (such as Boer attacks on blockhouses and columns) or to drop them off ahead of retreating Boer columns.

 Peace committees 

Among those Burghers who had stopped fighting, it was decided to form peace committees to persuade those who were still fighting to desist. In December 1900 Lord Kitchener gave permission that a central Burgher Peace Committee be inaugurated in Pretoria. By the end of 1900 some thirty envoys were sent out to the various districts to form local peace committees to persuade burghers to give up the fight. Previous leaders of the Boers, like Generals Piet de Wet and Andries Cronjé were involved in the organisation. Meyer de Kock was the only emissary of a peace committee to be convicted of high treason and executed by firing squad.

 Joiners 

Some burghers joined the British in their fight against the Boers. By the end of hostilities in May 1902, there were no fewer than 5,464 burghers working for the British.

 Orange Free State 

After having conferred with the Transvaal leaders, Christiaan de Wet returned to the Orange Free State, where he inspired a series of successful attacks and raids from the hitherto quiet western part of the country, though he suffered a rare defeat at Bothaville in November 1900. Many Boers who had earlier returned to their farms, sometimes giving formal parole to the British, took up arms again. In late January 1901, De Wet led a renewed invasion of Cape Colony. This was less successful, because there was no general uprising among the Cape Boers, and De Wet's men were hampered by bad weather and relentlessly pursued by British forces. They narrowly escaped across the Orange River.

From then until the final days of the war, De Wet remained comparatively quiet, partly because the Orange Free State was effectively left desolate by British sweeps. In late 1901, De Wet overran an isolated British detachment at Groenkop, inflicting heavy casualties. This prompted Kitchener to launch the first of the "New Model" drives against him. De Wet escaped the first such drive, but lost 300 of his fighters. This was a severe loss, and a portent of further attrition, although the subsequent attempts to round up De Wet were badly handled, and De Wet's forces avoided capture.

 Western Transvaal 

The Boer commandos in the Western Transvaal were very active after September 1901. Several battles of importance were fought here between September 1901 and March 1902. At Moedwil on 30 September 1901 and again at Driefontein on 24 October, General Koos De La Rey's forces attacked the British, but were forced to withdraw after the British offered strong resistance.

A time of relative quiet descended thereafter on the western Transvaal. February 1902 saw the next major battle in that region. On 25 February, Koos De La Rey attacked a British column under Lieutenant-Colonel S. B. von Donop at Ysterspruit near Wolmaransstad. De La Rey succeeded in capturing many men and a large amount of ammunition. The Boer attacks prompted Lord Methuen, the British second-in-command after Lord Kitchener, to move his column from Vryburg to Klerksdorp to deal with De La Rey. On the morning of 7 March 1902, the Boers attacked the rear guard of Methuen's moving column at Tweebosch. Confusion reigned in British ranks and Methuen was wounded and captured by the Boers.

The Boer victories in the west led to stronger action by the British. In the second half of March 1902, large British reinforcements were sent to the Western Transvaal under the direction of Ian Hamilton. The opportunity the British were waiting for arose on 11 April 1902 at Rooiwal, where a commando led by General Jan Kemp and Commandant Potgieter attacked a superior force under Kekewich. The British soldiers were well positioned on the hillside and inflicted severe casualties on the Boers charging on horseback over a large distance, beating them back. This was the end of the war in the Western Transvaal and also the last major battle of the war.

 Eastern Transvaal 

Two Boer forces fought in this area, one under Botha in the south east and a second under Ben Viljoen in the north east around Lydenburg. Botha's forces were particularly active, raiding railways and British supply convoys, and even mounting a renewed invasion of Natal in September 1901. After defeating British mounted infantry in the Battle of Blood River Poort near Dundee, Botha was forced to withdraw by heavy rains that made movement difficult and crippled his horses. Back on the Transvaal territory around his home district of Vryheid, Botha attacked a British raiding column at Bakenlaagte, using an effective mounted charge. One of the most active British units was effectively destroyed in this engagement. This made Botha's forces the target of increasingly large scorched earth drives by British forces, in which the British made particular use of native scouts and informers. Eventually, Botha had to abandon the high veld and retreat to a narrow enclave bordering Swaziland.

To the north, Ben Viljoen grew steadily less active. His forces mounted comparatively few attacks and as a result, the Boer enclave around Lydenburg was largely unmolested. Viljoen was eventually captured.

 Cape Colony 

In parts of Cape Colony, particularly the Cape Midlands District where Boers formed a majority of the white inhabitants, the British had always feared a general uprising against them. In fact, no such uprising took place, even in the early days of the war when Boer armies had advanced across the Orange. The cautious conduct of some of the elderly Orange Free State generals had been one factor that discouraged the Cape Boers from siding with the Boer republics. Nevertheless, there was widespread pro-Boer sympathy. Some of the Cape Dutch volunteered to help the British, but a much larger number volunteered to help the other side. The political factor was more important than the military: the Cape Dutch, according to Milner 90 percent of whom favoured the rebels, controlled the provincial legislature, and it's authorities forbade the British Army to burn farms or to force Boer civilians into concentration camps. The British had more limited options to suppress the insurgency in the Cape Colony as result.

After he escaped across the Orange in March 1901, Christiaan de Wet had left forces under Cape rebels Kritzinger and Gideon Scheepers to maintain a guerrilla campaign in the Cape Midlands. The campaign here was one of the least chivalrous of the war, with intimidation by both sides of each other's civilian sympathisers. In one of many skirmishes, Commandant Lotter's small commando was tracked down by a much-superior British column and wiped out at Groenkloof. Several captured rebels, including Lotter and Scheepers, who was captured when he fell ill with appendicitis, were executed by the British for treason or for capital crimes such as the murder of prisoners or of unarmed civilians. Some of the executions took place in public, to deter further disaffection.

Fresh Boer forces under Jan Christiaan Smuts, joined by the surviving rebels under Kritzinger, made another attack on the Cape in September 1901. They suffered severe hardships and were hard pressed by British columns, but eventually rescued themselves by routing some of their pursuers at the Battle of Elands River and capturing their equipment. From then until the end of the war, Smuts increased his forces from among Cape rebels until they numbered 3,000. However, no general uprising took place, and the situation in the Cape remained stalemated.

In January 1902, Boer leader Manie Maritz was implicated in the Leliefontein massacre in the far Northern Cape.

 Boer foreign volunteers 

While no other government actively supported the Boer cause, individuals from several countries volunteered and formed Foreign Volunteer Units. These primarily came from Europe, particularly the Netherlands, Germany and Sweden-Norway. Other countries such as France, Italy, Ireland (then part of the United Kingdom), and restive areas of the Russian Empire, including Poland and Georgia, also formed smaller volunteer corps. Finns fought in the Scandinavian Corps. Two volunteers, George Henri Anne-Marie Victor de Villebois-Mareuil of France and Yevgeny Maximov of Russia, became veggeneraals (fighting generals) of the South African Republic.

 Conclusion 

Towards the end of the war, British tactics of containment, denial, and harassment began to yield results against the guerrillas. The sourcing and co-ordination of intelligence became increasingly efficient with regular reporting from observers in the blockhouses, from units patrolling the fences and conducting "sweeper" operations, and from native Africans in rural areas who increasingly supplied intelligence, as the Scorched Earth policy took effect and they found themselves competing with the Boers for food supplies. Kitchener's forces at last began to seriously affect the Boers' fighting strength and freedom of manoeuvre, and made it harder for the Boers and their families to survive. Despite this success, almost half the Boer fighting strength, 15,000 men were still in the field fighting. Kitchener's tactics were very costly: Britain was running out of time and money and needed to change tack.

The British offered terms of peace on various occasions, notably in March 1901, but were rejected by Botha and the "Bitter-enders" among the Boers. They pledged to fight until the bitter end and rejected the demand for compromise made by the "Hands-uppers." Their reasons included hatred of the British, loyalty to their dead comrades, solidarity with fellow commandos, an intense desire for independence, religious arguments, and fear of captivity or punishment. On the other hand, their women and children were dying every day and independence seemed impossible.

The last of the Boers finally surrendered in May 1902 and the war ended with the Treaty of Vereeniging signed on 31 May 1902. After a period of obstinacy, the British reneged and offered the Boers generous terms of conditional surrender in order to bring the war to a victorious conclusion. The Boers were given £3,000,000 for reconstruction and were promised eventual limited self-government, which was granted in 1906 and 1907. The treaty ended the existence of the Transvaal and Orange Free State as independent Boer republics and placed them within the British Empire. The Union of South Africa was established as a dominion of the British Empire in 1910.

 Nonwhite roles 

The policy on both sides was to minimise the role of nonwhites, but the need for manpower continuously stretched those resolves. At the battle of Spion Kop in Ladysmith, Mohandas K. Gandhi with 300 free burgher Indians and 800 indentured Indian labourers started the Ambulance Corps serving the British side. As the war raged across African farms and their homes were destroyed, many became refugees and they, like the Boers, moved to the towns where the British hastily created internment camps. Subsequently, the British scorched earth policies were applied to both Boers and Africans. Although most black Africans were not considered by the British to be hostile, many tens of thousands were also forcibly removed from Boer areas and also placed in concentration camps. Africans were held separately from Boer internees. Eventually there were a total of 64 tented camps for Africans. Conditions were as bad as in the camps for the Boers, but even though, after the Fawcett Commission report, conditions improved in the Boer camps, "improvements were much slower in coming to the black camps"; 20,000 died there.

The Boers and the British both feared the consequences of arming Africans. The memories of the Zulu and other tribal conflicts were still fresh, and they recognised that whoever won would have to deal with the consequences of a mass militarisation of the tribes. There was therefore an unwritten agreement that this war would be a "white man's war." At the outset, British officials instructed all white magistrates in the Natal Colony to appeal to Zulu amakhosi (chiefs) to remain neutral, and President Kruger sent emissaries asking them to stay out of it. However, in some cases there were old scores to be settled, and some Africans, such as the Swazis, were eager to enter the war with the specific aim of reclaiming land won by the Boers. As the war went on there was greater involvement of Africans, and in particular large numbers became embroiled in the conflict on the British side, either voluntarily or involuntarily. By the end of the war, many Africans had been armed and had shown conspicuous gallantry in roles such as scouts, messengers, watchmen in blockhouses, and auxiliaries.

And there were more flash-points outside of the war. On 6 May 1902 at Holkrantz in the southeastern Transvaal, a Zulu faction had their cattle stolen and their women and children tortured by the Boers as a punishment for assisting the British. The local Boer officer then sent an insulting message to the tribe, challenging them to take back their cattle. The Zulus attacked at night, and in a mutual bloodbath, the Boers lost 56 killed and 3 wounded, while the Africans suffered 52 killed and 48 wounded.

About 10,000 black men were attached to Boer units where they performed camp duties; a handful unofficially fought in combat. The British Army employed over 14,000 Africans as wagon drivers. Even more had combatant roles as spies, guides, and eventually as soldiers. By 1902 there were about 30,000 armed Africans in the British Army.

 Concentration camps 

The term "concentration camp" was used to describe camps operated by the British in South Africa during this conflict in the years 1900–1902, and the term grew in prominence during this period.

The camps had originally been set up by the British Army as "refugee camps" to provide refuge for civilian families who had been forced to abandon their homes for whatever reason related to the war. However, when Kitchener took over in late 1900, he introduced new tactics in an attempt to break the guerrilla campaign and the influx of civilians grew dramatically as a result. Disease and starvation killed thousands. Kitchener initiated plans to

{{Quote frame|... flush out guerrillas in a series of systematic drives, organised like a sporting shoot, with success defined in a weekly 'bag' of killed, captured and wounded, and to sweep the country bare of everything that could give sustenance to the guerrillas, including women and children ... It was the clearance of civilians—uprooting a whole nation—that would come to dominate the last phase of the war.|Pakenham|The Boer War

As Boer farms were destroyed by the British under their "Scorched Earth" policy—including the systematic destruction of crops and slaughtering of livestock, the burning down of homesteads and farms —to prevent the Boers from resupplying from a home base, many tens of thousands of women and children were forcibly moved into the concentration camps. This was not the first appearance of internment camps, as the Spanish had used internment in Cuba in the Ten Years' War, but the Boer War concentration camp system was the first time that a whole nation had been systematically targeted, and the first in which whole regions had been depopulated.

Eventually, there were a total of 45 tented camps built for Boer internees and 64 for black Africans. Of the 28,000 Boer men captured as prisoners of war, 25,630 were sent overseas to prisoner-of-war camps throughout the British Empire. The vast majority of Boers remaining in the local camps were women and children. Around 26,370 Boer women and children were to perish in these concentration camps. Of the more than 120,000 Blacks (and Coloureds) imprisoned too, around 20,000 died.

The camps were poorly administered from the outset and became increasingly overcrowded when Kitchener's troops implemented the internment strategy on a vast scale. Conditions were terrible for the health of the internees, mainly due to neglect, poor hygiene and bad sanitation. The supply of all items was unreliable, partly because of the constant disruption of communication lines by the Boers. The food rations were meagre and there was a two-tier allocation policy, whereby families of men who were still fighting were routinely given smaller rations than others. The inadequate shelter, poor diet, bad hygiene and overcrowding led to malnutrition and endemic contagious diseases such as measles, typhoid, and dysentery, to which the children were particularly vulnerable. Coupled with a shortage of modern medical facilities, many of the internees died. While much of the British press, including The Times, played down the problems in the camps, Emily Hobhouse helped raise public awareness in Britain of the atrocious conditions, as well as being instrumental in bringing relief to the concentration camps.

 Cost of the war 

It is estimated that the total cost of the war to the British government was £211,156, 000 (equivalent to £19.9bn in 2022).

 Aftermath and analysis 

The Second Boer War cast long shadows over the history of the South African region. The predominantly agrarian society of the former Boer republics was profoundly and fundamentally affected by the scorched earth policy of Roberts and Kitchener. The devastation of both Boer and black African populations in the concentration camps and through war and exile were to have a lasting effect on the demography and quality of life in the region.

Many exiles and prisoners were unable to return to their farms at all; others attempted to do so but were forced to abandon the farms as unworkable given the damage caused by farm burning in the course of the scorched earth policy. Destitute Boers and black Africans swelled the ranks of the unskilled urban poor competing with the "uitlanders" in the mines.

The postwar reconstruction administration was presided over by Lord Milner and his largely Oxford trained Milner's Kindergarten. This small group of civil servants had a profound effect on the region, eventually leading to the Union of South Africa.

Some scholars, for good reasons, identify these new identities as partly underpinning the act of union that followed in 1910. Although challenged by a Boer rebellion only four years later, they did much to shape South African politics between the two world wars and right up to the present day.

The counterinsurgency techniques and lessons (the restriction of movement, the containment of space, the ruthless targeting of anything, everything and anyone that could give sustenance to guerrillas, the relentless harassment through sweeper groups coupled with rapid reaction forces, the sourcing and co-ordination of intelligence, and the nurturing of native allies) learned during the Boer War were used by the British (and other forces) in future guerrilla campaigns including to counter Malayan communist rebels during the Malayan Emergency. In World War II the British also adopted some of the concepts of raiding from the Boer commandos when, after the fall of France, they set up their special raiding forces, and in acknowledgement of their erstwhile enemies, chose the name British Commandos.

Many of the Boers referred to the war as the second of the Freedom Wars. The most resistant of Boers wanted to continue the fight and were known as "Bittereinders" (or irreconcilables) and at the end of the war a number of Boer fighters such as Deneys Reitz chose exile rather than sign an oath, such as the following, to pledge allegiance to Britain:

Over the following decade, many returned to South Africa and never signed the pledge. Some, like Reitz, eventually reconciled themselves to the new status quo, but others did not.

 Union of South Africa 

One of the most important events in the decade after the end of the war was the creation of the Union of South Africa (later the Republic of South Africa). It proved a key ally to Britain as a Dominion of the British Empire during the World Wars. At the start of the First World War a crisis ensued when the South African government led by Louis Botha and other former Boer fighters, such as Jan Smuts, declared support for Britain and agreed to send troops to take over the German colony of German South-West Africa (Namibia).

Many Boers were opposed to fighting for Britain, especially against Germany, which had been sympathetic to their struggle. A number of bittereinders and their allies took part in a revolt known as the Maritz Rebellion. This was quickly suppressed, and in 1916 the leading Boer rebels in the Maritz Rebellion escaped lightly (especially compared with the fate of leading Irish rebels of the Easter Rising), with terms of imprisonment of six and seven years and heavy fines. Two years later, they were released from prison, as Louis Botha recognised the value of reconciliation. Thereafter the bittereinders concentrated on political organisation within the constitutional system and built up what later became the National Party, which took power in 1948 and dominated the politics of South Africa from the late 1940s until the early 1990s, under the apartheid system.

 Effect of the war on domestic British politics 

Many Irish nationalists sympathised with the Boers, viewing them to be a people oppressed by British imperialism, much like they viewed themselves. Irish miners already in the Transvaal at the start of the war formed the nucleus of two Irish commandos. The Second Irish Brigade was headed up by an Australian of Irish parents, Colonel Arthur Lynch. In addition, small groups of Irish volunteers went to South Africa to fight with the Boers—this despite the fact that there were many Irish troops fighting in the British army, including the Royal Dublin Fusiliers. In Britain, the "Pro-Boer" campaign expanded, with writers often idealising the Boer society.

The war also highlighted the dangers of Britain's policy of non-alignment and deepened her isolation. The 1900 UK general election, also known as the "Khaki election", was called by the Prime Minister, Lord Salisbury, on the back of recent British victories. There was much enthusiasm for the war at this point, resulting in a victory for the Conservative government.

However, public support quickly waned as it became apparent that the war would not be easy and it dragged on, partially contributing to the Conservatives' spectacular defeat in 1906. There was public outrage at the use of scorched earth tactics and at the conditions in the concentration camps. It also became apparent that there were serious problems with public health in Britain since up to 40% of recruits in Britain were unfit for military service and suffered from medical problems such as rickets and other poverty-related illnesses. That came at a time of increasing concern for the state of the poor in Britain.

Having taken the country into a prolonged war, the Conservative government was rejected by the electorate at the first general election after the war was over. Balfour succeeded his uncle, Lord Salisbury in 1903, immediately after the war, took over a Conservative Party that had won two successive landslide majorities but led it to a landslide defeat in 1906.

The 2nd Anglo-Boer War was a victory that costed British taxpayers more than £200m; 22,000 Empire troops, and more than 400,000 army horses, donkeys and mules were killed. Britain had expected a swift victory against a mostly unmilitarised and predominantly agricultural-based opponent. However, the conflict dragged on into the 20th century and the reign of a new monarch. At the time, Britain was world’s most technologically advanced military. The results caused many both domestically and internationally to question the dominance of the British Empire, especially as nations like the United States, Germany, and Japan had started to become major powers.

 Horses 

The number of horses killed in the war was at the time unprecedented in modern warfare. For example, in the Relief of Kimberley, French's cavalry rode 500 horses to their deaths in a single day. The wastage was particularly heavy among British forces for several reasons: overloading of horses with unnecessary equipment and saddlery, failure to rest and acclimatise horses after long sea voyages and, later in the war, poor management by inexperienced mounted troops and distant control by unsympathetic staffs.  The average life expectancy of a British horse, from the time of its arrival in Port Elizabeth, was around six weeks.

Horses were slaughtered for their meat when needed. During the Siege of Kimberley and Siege of Ladysmith, horses were consumed as food once the regular sources of meat were depleted. The besieged British forces in Ladysmith also produced chevril, a Bovril-like paste, by boiling down the horse meat to a jelly paste and serving it like beef tea.

The Horse Memorial in Port Elizabeth is a tribute to the 300,000 horses that died during the conflict.

 Imperial involvement 

The vast majority of troops fighting for the British army came from Great Britain. Yet a significant number came from other parts of the British Empire. These countries had their own internal disputes over whether they should remain tied to London, or have full independence, which carried over into the debate around the sending of forces to assist the war. Though not fully independent on foreign affairs, these countries did have local say over how much support to provide, and the manner it was provided. Ultimately, Australia, Canada, New Zealand, and British South African Company-administered Rhodesia all sent volunteers to aid the United Kingdom. Troops were also raised to fight with the British from the Cape Colony and the Colony of Natal. Some Boer fighters, such as Jan Smuts and Louis Botha, were technically British subjects as they came from the Cape Colony and Colony of Natal, respectively.

There were also many volunteers from the Empire who were not selected for the official contingents from their countries and travelled privately to South Africa to form private units, such as the Canadian Scouts and Doyle's Australian Scouts. There were also some European volunteer units from British India and British Ceylon, though the British Government refused offers of non-white troops from the Empire. Some Cape Coloureds also volunteered early in the war, but later some of them were effectively conscripted and kept in segregated units. As a community, they received comparatively little reward for their services. In many ways, the war set the pattern for the Empire's later involvement in the two World Wars. Specially raised units, consisting mainly of volunteers, were dispatched overseas to serve with forces from elsewhere in the British Empire.

The United States stayed neutral in the conflict, but some American citizens were eager to participate. Early in the war Lord Roberts cabled the American Frederick Russell Burnham, a veteran of both Matabele wars but at that very moment prospecting in the Klondike, to serve on his personal staff as Chief of Scouts. Burnham went on to receive the highest awards of any American who served in the war, but American mercenaries participated on both sides.

 Australia 

From 1899 to 1901 the six separate self-governing colonies in Australia sent their own contingents to serve in the Boer War. That much of the population of the colonies had originated from Great Britain explains a general desire to support Britain during the conflict. After the colonies formed the Commonwealth of Australia in 1901, the new Government of Australia sent "Commonwealth" contingents to the war. The Boer War was thus the first war in which the Commonwealth of Australia fought. A few Australians fought on the Boer side. The most famous and colourful character was Colonel Arthur Alfred Lynch, formerly of Ballarat, Victoria, who raised the Second Irish Brigade.

The Australian climate and geography were far closer to that of South Africa than most other parts of the empire, so Australians adapted quickly to the environment, with troops serving mostly among the army's "mounted rifles." Enlistment in all official Australian contingents totalled 16,463. Another five to seven thousand Australians served in "irregular" regiments raised in South Africa. Perhaps five hundred Australian irregulars were killed. In total 20,000 or more Australians served and about 1,000 were killed. A total of 267 died from disease, 251 were killed in action or died from wounds sustained in battle. A further 43 men were reported missing.

When the war began some Australians, like some Britons, opposed it. As the war dragged on some Australians became disenchanted, in part because of the sufferings of Boer civilians reported in the press. In an interesting twist (for Australians), when the British missed capturing President Paul Kruger, as he escaped Pretoria during its fall in June 1900, a Melbourne Punch, 21 June 1900, cartoon depicted how the War could be won, using the Kelly Gang.

The convictions and executions of two Australian lieutenants, Harry Harbord Morant, colloquially known as 'The Breaker' for his skill with horses, and Peter Handcock in 1902, and the imprisonment of a third, George Witton, had minimal impact on the Australian public at the time despite later legend. The controversial court-martial saw the three convicted of executing Boer prisoners under their authority. After the war, though, Australians joined an empire-wide campaign that saw Witton released from jail. Much later, some Australians came to see the execution of Morant and Handcock as instances of wrongfully executed Australians, as illustrated in the 1980 Australian film Breaker Morant.

It is believed that up to 50 Aboriginal Australians served in the Boer War as trackers. According to Dale Kerwin, an Indigenous research fellow at Griffith University, such is the lack of information that is available about the trackers it is even uncertain as to whether they returned to Australia at the end of the war. He has claimed that at the end of the war in 1902 when the Australian contingents returned the trackers may not have been allowed back to Australia due to the White Australia Policy.

 Canada 

A total of around 8000 Canadians arrived in South Africa to fight for Britain. These arrived in two contingents: the first on 30 October 1899, the second on 21 January 1900. A third contongent of cavalry (Strathcona's Horse) embarked for South Africa on 16/17 March 1900. They remained until May 1902. With approximately 7,368 soldiers in a combat situation, the conflict became the largest military engagement involving Canadian soldiers from the time of Confederation until the Great War. Eventually, 270 of these soldiers died in the course of the Boer War.

The Canadian public was initially divided on the decision to go to war as some citizens did not want Canada to become Britain's 'tool' for engaging in armed conflicts. Many Anglophone citizens were pro-Empire, and wanted the prime minister, Sir Wilfrid Laurier, to support the British in their conflict. On the other hand, many Francophone citizens felt threatened by the continuation of British imperialism to their national sovereignty.

In the end, to appease the citizens who wanted war and to avoid angering those who oppose it, Laurier sent 1,000 volunteers under the command of Lieutenant Colonel William Otter to aid the confederation in its war to 'liberate' the peoples of the Boer controlled states in South Africa. The volunteers were provided to the British if the latter paid costs of the battalion after it arrived in South Africa.

The supporters of the war claimed that it "pitted British Freedom, justice and civilization against Boer backwardness". The French Canadians' opposition to the Canadian involvement in a British 'colonial venture' eventually led to a three-day riot in various areas of Quebec.

Commonwealth involvement in the Boer War can be summarised into three parts. The first part (October 1899 – December 1899) was characterised by questionable decisions and blunders from the Commonwealth leadership which affected its soldiers greatly. The soldiers of the Commonwealth were shocked at the number of Afrikaner soldiers who were willing to oppose the British. The Afrikaner troops were very willing to fight for their country, and were armed with modern weaponry and were highly mobile soldiers. This was one of the best examples of Guerrilla style warfare, which would be employed throughout the twentieth century after set piece fighting was seen as a hindrance by certain groups. The Boer soldiers would evade capture and secure provisions from their enemies therefore they were able to exist as a fighting entity for an indeterminate period of time.

The end of the First part was the period in mid-December, referred to as the "Black Week". During the week of 10–17 December 1899, the British suffered three major defeats at the hands of the Boers at the battlefields of Stormberg, Magersfontein and Colenso. Afterwards, the British called upon more volunteers to take part in the war from the Commonwealth.

The second part of the war (February–April 1900) was the opposite of the first. After the British reorganised and reinforced under new leadership, they began to experience success against the Boer soldiers. Commonwealth soldiers resorted to using blockhouses, farm burning and concentration camps to 'persuade' the resisting Boers into submission.

The final phase of the war was the guerrilla phase in which many Boer soldiers turned to guerrilla tactics such as raiding infrastructure or communications lines. Many Canadian soldiers did not actually see combat after they had been shipped over to South Africa since many arrived around the time of the signing of the Treaty of Vereeniging on 31 May 1902.

 India 

British garrisons in India contributed 18,534 British officers and men, as well as an estimated 10,000 Indian auxiliaries deployed to assist them. India also sent 7,000 horses, ponies and mules.

Indian auxiliaries were only employed in non-combatant roles.

The Natal Indian Ambulance Corps, created by Mohandas K. Gandhi and financed by the local Indian community, served at Colenso and Spion Kop.

 New Zealand 

When the Second Boer War seemed imminent, New Zealand offered its support. On 28 September 1899, Prime Minister Richard Seddon asked Parliament to approve the offer to the imperial government of a contingent of mounted rifles, thus becoming the first British Colony to send troops to the Boer War. The British position in the dispute with the Transvaal was "moderate and righteous," he maintained. He stressed the "crimson tie" of Empire that bound New Zealand to the mother-country and the importance of a strong British Empire for the colony's security.

By the time peace was concluded two and a half years later, 10 contingents of volunteers, totalling nearly 6,500 men from New Zealand, with 8,000 horses had fought in the conflict, along with doctors, nurses, veterinary surgeons and a small number of school teachers. Some 70 New Zealanders died from enemy action, with another 158 killed accidentally or by disease. The first New Zealander to be killed was Farrier G.R. Bradford at Jasfontein Farm on 18 December 1899. The Boer War was greeted with extraordinary enthusiasm when the war was over, and peace was greeted with patriotism and national pride. This is best shown by the fact that the Third, Fourth and Fifth contingents from New Zealand were funded by public conscription.

 Rhodesia 

Rhodesian military units such as the British South Africa Police, Rhodesia Regiment and Southern Rhodesian Volunteers served in the Second Boer War.

 South Africa 

During the war, the British army also included substantial contingents from South Africa itself. There were large communities of English-speaking immigrants and settlers in Natal and Cape Colony (especially around Cape Town and Grahamstown), which formed volunteer units that took the field, or local "town guards." At one stage of the war, a "Colonial Division," consisting of five light horse and infantry units under Brigadier General Edward Brabant, took part in the invasion of the Orange Free State. Part of it withstood a siege by Christiaan de Wet at Wepener on the borders of Basutoland. Another large source of volunteers was the uitlander community, many of whom hastily left Johannesburg in the days immediately preceding the war.

Later during the war, Lord Kitchener attempted to form a Boer Police Force, as part of his efforts to pacify the occupied areas and effect a reconciliation with the Boer community. The members of this force were despised as traitors by the Boers still in the field. Those Boers who attempted to remain neutral after giving their parole to British forces were derided as "hensoppers" (hands-uppers) and were often coerced into giving support to the Boer guerrillas (which formed one of the reasons for the British decision to launch scorched earth campaigns throughout the countryside and detain Boers in concentration camps in order to deny anything of use to the Boer guerillas).

Like the Canadian and particularly the Australian and New Zealand contingents, many of the volunteer units formed by South Africans were "light horse" or mounted infantry, well suited to the countryside and manner of warfare. Some regular British officers scorned their comparative lack of formal discipline, but the light horse units were hardier and more suited to the demands of campaigning than the overloaded British cavalry, who were still obsessed with the charge by lance or sabre. At their peak, 24,000 South Africans (including volunteers from the Empire) served in the field in various "colonial" units. Notable units (in addition to the Imperial Light Horse) were the South African Light Horse, Rimington's Guides, Kitchener's Horse and the Imperial Light Infantry.

Notable participants

 Boer leaders 
 Louis Botha
 Koos de la Rey
 Paul Kruger
 Christiaan de Wet

 United Kingdom and empire 

 Military leaders 
 Redvers Buller
 Robert Baden-Powell, 1st Baron Baden-Powell
 Douglas Haig, 1st Earl Haig
 John French, 1st Earl of Ypres
 Herbert Kitchener, 1st Earl Kitchener
 Frederick Roberts, 1st Earl Roberts

 Civilians and other combatants Harold Lothrop Borden – Only son of Canada's Canadian Minister of Defence and Militia, Frederick William Borden. Serving in the Royal Canadian Dragoons, he became the most famous Canadian casualty of the Second Boer War. Queen Victoria asked F. W. Borden for a photograph of his son, Prime Minister Wilfrid Laurier praised his services, tributes arrived from across Canada, and in his home town Canning, Nova Scotia, there is a monument (by Hamilton MacCarthy) erected to his memory.Sam Hughes – Senior Militia officer and later a Federally elected cabinet minister. As a very patriotic individual, Hughes became involved in the Boer war as a member of Brigadier-General Herbert Settle's expedition after Hughes unsuccessfully tried to raise his own brigade of soldiers. Hughes was noted by his colleagues for having a dislike of professional soldiers and he was noted for being an exceptional leader of irregular soldiers, whom he preferred to lead in combat. However, Hughes was dismissed and was sent home in the summer of 1900 for; sending letters back home which were published outlining British command incompetence, his impatience and boastfulness and his providing surrendering enemies favourable conditions. When he arrived back in Canada, Hughes became very active politically, and he would eventually start his political career with the Conservatives. When he became a Member of Parliament (Canada) (MP), Hughes would be in the position to become the Canadian Minister of Defence and Militia in 1911, just prior the outbreak of World War I. This was a position that Hughes would be dismissed from in 1916, due once again to his impatience, among other reasons.John McCrae – Best known as the author of the World War I poem In Flanders Fields, McCrae started his active military service in the Boer War as an artillery officer. After completing several major campaigns, McCrae's artillery unit was sent home to Canada in 1901 with what would be referred to today as an 'honourable discharge'. McCrae ended up becoming a special professor in the University of Vermont for pathology and he would later serve in World War I as a Medical officer until his death from pneumonia while on active duty in 1918.Harry "Breaker" Morant – Australian soldier, bush-poet, and horse-breaker hence his nickname, who as a commanding officer is accused of participation in summary executions of Boer prisoners – under orders from Kitchener it was argued by Morant and co-accused during his court-martial, although this is still debated due to the lack of British military papers being released for examination by Australian military historians – and the killing of a German missionary who had been a witness to the shootings. Morant was found guilty along with Peter Handcock and George Witton at their court-martial, with the two former being executed and the latter's sentence commuted, and later released from British prison to return to Australia after sustained public pressure to do so. This entire affair is still extremely controversial in Australian military history, predominantly regarding Australian officers under the command of British officers being tried by the British instead of by fellow Australians, as Federation occurred during the Boer War.Winston Churchill – Best known as the prime minister of Britain. During the main part of the Second Boer War, Churchill worked as a war correspondent for The Morning Post. At the age of twenty-six, he was captured and held prisoner in a camp in Pretoria from which he escaped and rejoined the British army. He received a commission in the South African Light Horse (still working as a correspondent) and witnessed the capture of Ladysmith and Pretoria.Mahatma Gandhi – Best known as the leader of the independence movement in India, he lived in South Africa 1893–1915 where he worked on behalf of Indians. He volunteered in 1900 to help the British by forming teams of ambulance drivers and raising 1100 Indian volunteer medics. At Spioenkop Gandhi and his bearers had to carry wounded soldiers for miles to a field hospital because the terrain was too rough for the ambulances. General Redvers Buller mentioned the courage of the Indians in his dispatch. Gandhi and thirty-seven other Indians received the War Medal.Sir Arthur Conan Doyle– Author and creator of Sherlock Holmes. Served as a volunteer doctor in the Langman Field Hospital at Bloemfontein between March and June 1900. In his widely distributed and translated pamphlet 'The War in South Africa: Its Cause and Conduct' he justified both the reasonings behind the war and handling of the conflict itself. In response to complaints about concentration camps he pointed out that over 14,000 British soldiers had died of disease during the conflict (as opposed to 8,000 killed in combat) and at the height of epidemics he was seeing 50–60 British soldiers dying each day in a single ill-equipped and overwhelmed military hospital.James Craig, 1st Viscount Craigavon''' – Future Prime Minister of Northern Ireland. Served as a Captain in the 3rd Battalion of the Royal Irish Rifles and as part of the 13th battalion of the Imperial Yeomanry. He was captured in 1900 but released due to a perforated colon and served as a deputy assistant director of the Imperial Military Railways until being evacuated to the UK due to ill-health."The War – Embarcation of Troops". The Times (36078). London. 1 March 1900. p. 7.

 Canadian Victoria Cross recipients 

The Victoria Cross, is the highest military medal available to soldiers of the Brirush Empire, including those fighting for in Commonwealth armies and those of former British Territories. It is awarded based on exemplary bravery and valour in the presence of danger.

Four Canadian soldiers who fought in the Second Boer War were awarded the Victoria Cross:
 Sergeant Arthur Herbert Lindsay Richardson – of Lord Strathcona's Horse. Richardson rode a wounded horse, while wounded himself, back into enemy fire to retrieve a wounded comrade whose horse had been killed at Wolve Spruit on 5 July 1900.
 Lieutenant Hampden Zane Churchill Cockburn – of the Royal Canadian Dragoons, Cockburn received his Victoria Cross on 7 November 1900 when his unit was the rear guard at Leliefontein. Cockburn, along with fellow Victoria Cross recipient Lieutenant R.E.W. Turner, held off an advancing group of Boer soldiers in order to allow two Canadian Field guns to escape along with their crews. Cockburn was wounded and captured by the Boer soldiers.
 Lieutenant Richard Ernest William Turner – of the Royal Canadian Dragoons. Turner received his Victoria Cross in the same engagement as Cockburn. Though wounded, Turner was still able to escape capture, unlike Cockburn. Turner would later become a high-ranking officer in the Canadian army in World War I.
 Sergeant Edward James Gibson Holland –  of the Royal Canadian Dragoons. Holland received the Victoria Cross for valor during a rear-guard action at the same battle as Cockburn and Turner. Holland held off the advancing Boers with a carriage-mounted Colt machine gun, despite the position's becoming increasingly dangerous due to the proximity of the enemy Holland remained at his position until his gun jammed. In order to prevent it from falling into enemy hands, Holland removed the Colt from the carriage and retreated on horseback, gun in hand.

 Final overview 

The Second Boer War was the harbinger of a new type of combat which would persevere throughout the twentieth century, guerrilla warfare. After the war was over, the entire British army underwent a period of reform which was focused on lessening the emphasis placed on mounted units in combat. It was determined that the traditional role of cavalry was antiquated and improperly used on the battlefield in the modern warfare of the Boer War, and that the First World War was the final proof that mounted attacks had no place in twentieth century combat. Cavalry was put to better use after the reforms in the theatres of the Middle East and World War I, and the idea of mounted infantry was useful in the times when the war was more mobile. An example was during the First World War during the Battle of Mons in which the British cavalry held the Belgian town against an initial German assault. Another was the use of mounted infantry at the Battle of Megiddo (1918) in which Allenby's force routed the enemy owing to speed and dexterity of arms.

The Canadian units of the Royal Canadian Dragoons and the Royal Canadian Mounted Rifles fought in the First World War in the same role as the Boer War. However, during, and after, the Second World War the regiments swapped their horses for mechanised vehicles. It was also the beginning of types of conflict involving machine guns, shrapnel and observation balloons which were all used extensively in the First World War. To the Canadians however, attrition was the leading cause of death in the second Boer war, with disease being the cause of approximately half of the Canadian deaths.

Canadians ended the war with four Victoria Crosses to its soldiers and two more Victoria Crosses were given to Canadian doctors attached to British Medical Corps units, Lieutenant H.E.M. Douglas (1899, Magersfontein) and Lieutenant W.H.S. Nickerson (1900, Wakkerstroom). Not all soldiers saw action since many landed in South Africa after the hostilities ended while others (including the 3rd Special Service Battalion, The Royal Canadian Regiment) performed garrison duty in Halifax, Nova Scotia so that their British counterparts could join at the front lines. Later on, contingents of Canadians served with the paramilitary South Africa Constabulary.

Both sides used a scorched Earth policy to deprive the marching enemy of food. And both had to corral civilians into makeshift huts by 'concentrating' them into camps. For example, at Buffelspoort, British soldiers were held in captivity in Boer encampments after surrendering their arms, and civilians were often mixed in with service personnel because the Boers did not have the resources to do otherwise. A total of 116,000 women, children and Boer soldiers were confined to the Commonwealth concentration camps, of which at least 28,000, mainly women and children, would die. The lack of food, water, and sanitary provisions was a feature of 20th-century warfare for both civilians and armed services personnel, yet one consequence of the Boer War and investigative commissions was the implementation of The Hague Convention (1899) and Geneva Convention (1904); of which there were many further agreements thereafter.

 Views on British tactics 

The British saw their tactics of scorched earth and concentration camps as a legitimate way of depriving the Boer guerrillas of supplies and safe havens. The Boers saw them as a British attempt to coerce the Boers into surrender, with the camp inmates – mainly families of Boer fighters – seen as deliberately kept in poor conditions to encourage high death rates. Even in 2019, the controversy around the British tactics continued to make headlines.

 Commemorations 

The Australian National Boer War Memorial Committee organises events to mark the war on 31 May each year. In Canberra, a commemorative service is usually held at the Saint John the Baptist Anglican Church in Reid. Floral tributes are laid for the dead.

 See also 
 Bombardment in the Second Boer War
 British logistics in the Boer War
 First Italo–Ethiopian War
 List of Second Boer War Victoria Cross recipients
 London to Ladysmith via Pretoria''
 History of South Africa
 Military history of South Africa
 Volkstaat
 First Boer War
 Scramble for Africa

Notes

References

Citations

Sources 
 
 
 
 
 
 
 
 
 
 
 
 
 
 
 
 
 
 
 
 
 
 
 
  cites
 
 
 
 excerpt and text search; a standard scholarly history
 
 
 
 
 
 
 
 
 
 
 
 
 
 
 
 
 
 
 
 
 
 
 
 
 
 
 
 
 
 
 
 
 
 
 
 
 
 
 
  excerpt

Historiography

Further reading 
 
 
 
 
 
 
 
  – an anthology frequently cited in this article.
 
  – a Boer War bibliography of on-line books.
  – detailed official British history
 volume 1, maps volume 1 (1906)
 volume 2, maps volume 2 (1907)
 volume 3, maps volume 3 (1908)
 volume 4, maps volume 4 (1910)

External links 

 Americanhistoryprojects.com: links to books & articles on Second Boer War
 Scrapbook of Boer War, MSS P 456 at L. Tom Perry Special Collections, Harold B. Lee Library, Brigham Young University

 
 
1899 in South Africa
1900 in South Africa
1901 in South Africa
1902 in South Africa
1890s in the South African Republic
1900s in the South African Republic
1890s in Transvaal
1900s in Transvaal
Boer War 2
Boer War 2
Boer War 2
Boer War 2
Boer War 2
Boer War 2
Boer War 2
Boer War 2
Boer War 2
Boer War 2
Boer War 2
Boer War 2
Boer War 2
Boer War 2
Boer War 2
Boer War 2
Boer War 2
Boer War 2
Boer War 2
1899 beginnings
1902 endings
Canadian Army
Canadian Militia